Carlos Valdés Galán (November 4, 1926 – December 4, 2007), better known as Patato, was a Cuban conga player. In 1954, he emigrated from La Habana to New York City where he continued his prolific career as a sideman for several jazz and Latin music ensembles, and occasionally as a bandleader. He contributed to the development of the tunable conga drum which revolutionized the use of the instrument in the US. His experimental descarga albums recorded for Latin Percussion are considered the counterpart to the commercial salsa boom of the 1970s. Tito Puente once called him "the greatest conguero alive today".

Nicknames
Like most Cuban musicians, Carlos Valdés had several nicknames throughout his artistic career. Early on he was known as "El Toro" (The Bull) as a young dancer and boxer. In school he was known as "Patato" (Potato) due to his short stature; more disrespectfully he was known as "Remache" and "Tampón de bañera" around his neighbourhood. While playing alongside Armando Peraza in Havana's Zombie Club, he was known as "El Zombie", "Zombito" or "Pequeño Zombie" (Little Zombie). Due to his dancing style he was known as "Pingüino" (Penguin). Nonetheless, "Patato" was the name that stuck and he carried this pseudonym to the US, where he was often miscredited as "Potato Valdez".

Life

Early life and career 
Carlos Valdés Galán was born in the neighbourhood of Los Sitios in La Habana on November 4, 1926. His father, Carlos Valdés Brito, was a tres player who was part of the seminal coro de clave Los Apaches, and author of the son "Maldita timidez" recorded by Sexteto Habanero. The rest of his family included many other musicians and santeros; his cousin was the singer Francisco Fellove aka "El Gran Fellove". Carlos soon followed his father footsteps, learning to play the tres and a wide variety of percussion instruments, including the marímbula, the botija, the shekere, the tambourine, the cajón and the double bass. He became a member of the comparsa Las sultanas in which he played the congas (tumbadoras). He became a master of the instrument at a young age, playing alongside other greats such as Mongo Santamaría, Cándido Camero, Julito Collazo and Armando Peraza. The latter was his neighbour and partner in the Conjunto Kubavana led by Alberto Ruiz. He was only 18 years old when he joined this band in 1944. He left the group in 1947 to join the well-known Sonora Matancera, where he stayed for a year. From 1949 to 1954 he played for the Conjunto Casino, one of the most popular bands in La Habana at the time. In 1952, they toured New York City, where fellow drummer Cándido Camero decided to stay. Patato would make the same decision two years later.

Exile 
Attracted by New York's thriving jazz scene, Patato left Cuba indefinitely on October 5, 1954. His first full-length recording as a sideman was the notorious LP Afro-Cuban by Kenny Dorham. He went on to perform live alongside Mongo Santamaría and Tito Puente in Harlem. He then joined several ensembles, including those led by Willie Bobo, Machito and Charlie Palmieri. He recorded with jazz drummers Art Blakey, Art Taylor and Max Roach. By the early 1960s, Patato was amongst the most sought-after conga drummers in New York. His association with flautist and bandleader Herbie Mann would last over fifteen years. In 1959, the United States Department of State funded a trip for bandleader Herbie Mann to visit Africa, after they heard his version of "African Suite." The grueling 14-week tour took place between 12/31/1959 to 4/5/1960 featuring Mann (bandleader, flute and saxophone), Johnny Rae (vibraphone and arrangements), Don Payne (bass), Doc Cheatham (trumpet), Jimmy Knepper (trombone), Carlos "Patato" Valdés (congas) and José Mangual, Sr. (bongos). They toured Sierra Leone, Liberia, Nigeria, Mozambique, Rhodesia, Tanganyika, Kenya, Ethiopia, Sudan, Morocco and Tunisia.

Patato accompanied Dizzy Gillespie and Quincy Jones on extended tours throughout Europe. He acted in and composed the title song of The Bill Cosby Show. In 1977 he took part in the recording of Cachao's comeback albums. In 1991, he contributed to the movie soundtrack for The Mambo Kings Play Songs of Love. Patato was the leader of his own band, Afrojazzia, which toured Europe in the spring of 1994. In 1995 he recorded the album "Ritmo y candela" with fellow percussionists Changuito and Orestes Vilató. Similarly, together with Giovanni Hidalgo and Candido Camero he released an album in 2000 entitled The Conga Kings. That year he appeared in the documentary Calle 54. In 2001, Patato was inducted into the International Latin Music Hall of Fame.

Death 
A lifetime smoker, Patato had emphysema and died of respiratory failure in Cleveland, Ohio on December 4, 2007.

Style and craft 
For over 60 years Carlos "Patato" Valdés demonstrated how a musician could combine technical skill with superb showmanship. His conga playing demonstrated the fusion of melody and rhythm. It also reflected his keen understanding of rhythm as a biological constant that is rooted, quite literally, in the human heartbeat. During his performances, Patato even mastered the art of playing his congas while dancing on top of them, to the delight of the audience.

Valdés dazzled audiences well into his seventies with his rumba moves. He is also the man who gave Brigitte Bardot a mambo lesson in the film And God Created Woman. Valdés also expressed his understanding of melody through bass and tres.

During the late 1940s he helped develop the first tunable congas, as earlier models were tuned by the unwieldy method of heating them with a sterno can. His interest in design, as well as his friendship with LP Founder Martin Cohen, led to the development of the LP Patato Model Congas, one of the top-selling conga drums of all time.

Personal life
Valdés was the father of Carlos Hernández, better known as Chick Hernández, a sports anchor/reporter for Comcast SportsNet/NBC sports.

Discography

As leader
1967: Patato & Totico (Verve) (also reissued as Nuestro barrio) - with Eugenio "Totico" Arango
1976: Authority (Latin Percussion Ventures)
1976: Ready for Freddy (Latin Percussion Ventures)
1980: Batá y rumba (Latin Percussion Ventures)
1993: Masterpiece (Messidor)
1995: Ritmo y candela (Tonga) - with Changuito and Orestes Vilató
1996: Ritmo y candela II (Round World)
1997: Único y diferente (Connector Music)
2000: The Conga Kings (Chesky) - with Giovanni Hidalgo and Cándido Camero
2001: Jazz descargas (Chesky) - with Giovanni Hidalgo and Cándido Camero
2004: El hombre (Mambo Maniacs)
2006: Live at the Canal Room (USA Records)

As sideman
With Art Blakey
Orgy in Rhythm (Blue Note, 1957)

With Willie Bobo
Uno Dos Tres 1•2•3 (Verve, 1966)

With Alberto Beltrán & Conjunto Casino
El negrito del batey (Panart, 1955)

With Cachao
Descarga '77 (Salsoul, 1977)
Dos (Salsoul, 1977)

With Rafael Cortijo
Patato y Cortijo – Guaguancó (Teca, c. 1970)

With Antonio "Chocolate" Díaz Mena
Eso es Latin Jazz ...Man! (Audio Fidelity, 1963)

With Dizzy Gillespie
The Ebullient Mr. Gillespie (Verve, 1959)
Have Trumpet, Will Excite! (Verve, 1959)
Portrait of Jenny (Perception, 1970)

With Benny Golson
Remembering Clifford (Milestone, 1998)

With Johnny Griffin & Matthew Gee
Soul Groove (Atlantic, 1963)

With Quincy Jones
Quincy Plays for Pussycats (Mercury, 1959-65 [1965])

With the Latin Percussion Jazz Ensemble
Just Like Magic (Latin Percussion Ventures, 1979)
Live at Montreux (Latin Percussion Ventures, 1980)

With Johnny Lytle
Swingin' at the Gate (Pacific Jazz, 1967)

With Machito
Kenya (Roulette, 1958)

With Herbie Mann
Flautista! (Verve, 1959)
Herbie Mann's African Suite (United Artists, 1959)
Right Now (Atlantic, 1962)
Brazil, Bossa Nova & Blues (UA Jazz, 1962)
Herbie Mann Live at Newport (Atlantic, 1963)
My Kinda Groove (Atlantic, 1965)
Herbie Mann Plays The Roar of the Greasepaint – The Smell of the Crowd (Atlantic, 1965)
Monday Night at the Village Gate (Atlantic, 1965 [1966])
Latin Mann (Columbia, 1965)
Standing Ovation at Newport (Atlantic, 1965)
Today! (Atlantic, 1966)
Our Mann Flute (Atlantic, 1966)
New Mann at Newport (Atlantic, 1967)
Impressions of the Middle East (Atlantic, 1967)
A Mann & A Woman (Atlantic, 1966) with Tamiko Jones
The Beat Goes On (Atlantic, 1967)
The Herbie Mann String Album (Atlantic, 1967)
Mississippi Gambler (Atlantic, 1972)
First Light (Atlantic, 1974)
Reggae II (Atlantic, 1973 [1976])

With Johnny Pacheco
His Flute and Latin Jam (Fania, 1965)

With Charlie Palmieri and His Charanga "La Duboney"
Pachanga at the Caravana Club (Alegre, 1961)

With Duke Pearson
The Phantom (Blue Note, 1969)

With Dave Pike
Manhattan Latin (Decca, 1964)

With Tito Puente
Puente in Percussion (Tico, 1956)
Top Percussion (RCA Victor, 1958)
Tambó (RCA Victor, 1960)

With Kenny Dorham
Afro-Cuban (Blue Note, 1955)

With Don Ellis
Shock Treatment (Columbia, 1968)

With Stan Free
Piano a la Percussion (Old Town, 1961)

With Mike Longo
Matrix (Mainstream, 1972)
Funkia (Groove Merchant, 1974)

With Johnny Richards
The Rites of Diablo (Roulette, 1958)

With Al Jazzbo Collins
Presents Swinging At The Opera (Everest, 1960)

With Grant Green
The Latin Bit (Blue Note, 1963)

With Charlie Rouse
Bossa Nova Bacchanal (Blue Note, 1963)

With Max Roach
Percussion Bitter Sweet (Impulse!, 1961)

With Jorge Dalto
Rendez-Vous (Eastworld, 1983)
Urban Oasis (Concord Jazz Picante, 1985)

 With Orchestre Keur Samba
Une soirée a Keur Samba (BAM, 1961)

With Elvin Jones
Mr. Jones (Blue Note, 1973)

With Ben Tucker
Baby, You Should Know It (Ava, 1963)

With José Mangual, Sr.
Buyú (Turnstyle, 1977)
Authority (LP Records, 1977)

With Alfredo Rodríguez
Alfredo Rodríguez (Espérance, 1983)

With Onelio Scull
Santería cubana (Santero)
Fiesta santera (Santero, 1983)

With Sonny Stitt
Stitt Goes Latin (Roost, 1963)

With Art Taylor
A.T.'s Delight (Blue Note, 1961)

With Cal Tjader
Soul Burst (Verve, 1966)

With Bebo Valdés
Bebo Rides Again (Messidor, 1995)
El arte del sabor (Blue Note, 2001)

Compilations
The Legend of Cuban Percussion (Six Degrees, 2000)

Contributing artist
Afro-Cuba: The Jazz Roots of Cuban Rhythm (Nascente, 1995)
Nu Yorica 2! (Soul Jazz, 1997)
The Rough Guide to Salsa (World Music Network, 1997)
Diggin' the Crates for Afro-Cuban Funk (Empire Musicwerks, 2001)

References

External links 
 
Cantrell, David & Sánchez Coll, Israel. El legado de Carlos Patato Valdés, Herencia Latina.
Carlos "Patato" Valdez, Donald's Encyclopedia of Popular Music.
Carlos "Patato" Valdés, AllMusic.
Carlos "Patato" Valdés, Discogs.
Carlos "Patato" Valdés, Rate Your Music.

1926 births
2007 deaths
American entertainers of Cuban descent
Conga players
Cuban emigrants to the United States
Cuban percussionists
Jazz percussionists
Deaths from respiratory failure
Chesky Records artists